Juan Pablo is a common combination of Spanish given names. It is the equivalent of "John Paul" in English or "Jean-Paul" in French. Notable people with the name include:

 Juan Pablo Ángel (born 1975), Colombian football player
 Juan Pablo Arenas (born 1987) is a Chilean football player
 Juan Pablo Bennett (1871–1951), Chilean dictator
 Juan Pablo Bonet, 17th-century Spanish priest and educator
 Juan Pablo Brzezicki (born 1982) is a professional tennis player from Buenos Aires, Argentina.
 Juan Pablo Caffa (born 1984), Argentine football player
 Juan Pablo Carrizo (born 1984), Argentine football player
 Juan Pablo Colinas (born 1978), better known as simply Juan Pablo, Spanish football player
 Juan Pablo Di Pace (born 1979), Argentine model
 Juan Pablo Duarte, 19th century visionary and liberal thinker
 Juan Pablo Forero (born 1983), Colombian track and road cyclist
 Juan Pablo Francia (born 1984), Argentine football player
 Juan Pablo Galavis (born 1981), Venezuelan football player
 Juan Pablo García (born 1981), Mexican football player
 Juan Pablo Hourquebie (born 1976), Argentine hockey player
 Juan Pablo Montoya (born 1975), race car driver
 Juan Pablo Raies, Argentine rally driver
 Juan Pablo Rodríguez (born 1979), Mexican football player
 Juan Pablo Santiago (born 1980), Mexican football player
 Juan Pablo Sorín (born 1976), Argentine football player
 Juan Pablo Vizcardo y Guzmán (1748-1798), Peruvian writer and precursor of Latin American independence

See also
 Juan Pablo II (disambiguation)